9am with David & Kim is an Australian morning show which premiered on Monday 30 January 2006 on Network Ten. It aired live from 9am - 11am weekdays, and was hosted by musician and former Getaway reporter David Reyne and former National Nine News presenter and journalist Kim Watkins. Fill in presenters have included Ann-Maree Biggar, Christi Malthouse, Corinne Grant, Kathryn Robinson, Stephen Quartermain and music mogul Ian Dickson.

The program replaced long time morning program Good Morning Australia with Bert Newton, which finished in late 2005, after Bert Newton returned to the Nine Network. Sandy Paterson was the executive producer of the program. Throughout its run the show had struggled behind competing programs The Morning Show and Mornings with Kerri-Anne, averaging around 50,000 viewers an episode.

Demise 
In August 2009, Reyne announced that he will be leaving 9am at the end of the year, after 4 years with the show and Ten. On 7 December 2009 Watkins also confirmed she had also quit the show, with Ten programmer David Mott announcing a brand new concept for the timeslot next year. It is unclear whether Watkins has left the network altogether. The final ever show aired on Friday 11 December 2009 due to a strong competition with Seven's The Morning Show. 9am Summertime concluded on 5 February 2010. The following week after the demise the 9am website was removed.
 
On 16 January 2010, it was announced The Circle would be the replacement show, which started on 9 February 10am-12pm following the new time slot for the Ten Morning News hour 9am-10am.

Segments 
9am included a mix of lifestyle, cooking and interview segments along with advertorials. The advertorials were for products from home-shopping companies such as Danoz Direct and Global Shop Direct, and were mostly presented by Marianne van Dorslar & Ann-Maree Biggar.

Regular segments and their hosts included:
 Family Matters: Dr John Irvine
 Your Garden: David Kirkpatrick
 Fashion, style, beauty and home: Dhav Naidu
 Health and Fitness: Christi Malthouse and Craig Harper
 Entertainment: Benjamin Hart
 Your Pets: Dr Julie Summerfield
 Your Health: Dr David Spencer
 Music: Ian Dickson
 Cooking: Chef Arianne Spratt
 Your Place: Ann-Maree Biggar
 Lifestyle Travel: Shannon Watts

At the start of the program Kim Watkins read the news headlines, and at 10.15am Ten News presenter Natarsha Belling presents a news update. At the end of each show, Reyne used his trademark sign-off - using a different adjective in place of "nice" as in "Have a nice day" (for example, "Have a colossal day").

Celebrity fill-ins 
 Martin Short (Monday 25 May 2009)
 Nia Vardalos (Friday 10 July 2009)
 Frank Woodley (Friday 23 October 2009)

9am Summertime 
Over summer Ann-Maree Biggar presented a pre-recorded show of highlights throughout the year.

Although the program was pre-recorded the advertorials shown were live.

See also 
 The Circle
 List of programs broadcast by Network Ten
 List of Australian television series

Notes 

  This includes 30 "Summertime" episodes which ran from 18 December 2006 to 26 January 2007.

References

External links 
 

2006 Australian television series debuts
2009 Australian television series endings
Australian variety television shows
Duos
English-language television shows
Network 10 original programming
Television shows set in Melbourne